The Baby Maker is a 1970 American drama film that was directed and co-written by James Bridges and released by National General Pictures.

Plot
Tish Gray is a flower child who is hired to have the baby of a middle-class couple, Suzanne and Jay Wilcox. The film exposes the clash of values between Tish, her boyfriend Tad Jacks, and the couple. It also deals with the emotional turmoil all four characters go through.

Cast
 Barbara Hershey as Tish Gray
 Collin Wilcox Paxton as Suzanne Wilcox (as Collin Wilcox-Horne)
 Sam Groom as Jay Wilcox
 Scott Glenn as Tad Jacks
 Jeannie Berlin as Charlotte
 Lili Valenty as Mrs. Culnick
 Helena Kallianiotes as Wanda
 Jeff Siggins as Dexter
 Phyllis Coates as Tish's Mother
 Madge Kennedy as Tish's Grandmother
 Ray Hemphill as the Toy Store 'Killer'
 Paul Linke as Sam
 Bobby Pickett as Dr. Sims
 Samuel Francis as The Single Wing Turquoise Bird
 Alan Keesling as The Single Wing Turquoise Bird (2)

Release
The film had its premiere on October 1, 1970 at the Plaza and New Embassy Theatres in New York.

Reception
Criticizing the directing and writing of James Bridges, critic Shirley Rigby said of the "bizarre" film, "Only the performances in the film save it from being a total travesty."  Rigby went on to say, "Barbara Hershey is a great little actress, much, much more than just another pretty face." John Simon called The Baby Maker "insufferable".

DVD
The Baby Maker was released to DVD by Warner Home Video on March 23, 2009, via the Warner Archives DVD-on-demand service as a Region 1 DVD.

See also
List of American films of 1970
Immediate Family 
Juno

References

External links
 
 
 

1970 films
1970 drama films
American drama films
1970s English-language films
Films directed by James Bridges
Films scored by Fred Karlin
Films set in Los Angeles
Films about surrogacy
National General Pictures films
Films about adoption
American pregnancy films
1970 directorial debut films
1970s pregnancy films
1970s American films
Films produced by Robert Wise